NGR-hTNF is an experimental antitumor drug designed to act on tumor blood vessels. It is currently undergoing Phase III clinical trials   for treatment of malignant pleural  mesothelioma caused by exposure to asbestos.  NGR-hTNF is also being investigated, alone or in combination with chemotherapy, on four different solid tumors  in four other randomized Phase II trials.

NGR-hTNF is a recombinant protein derived from the fusion between peptide CNGRCG  and human tumor necrosis factor alpha
 (TNFα).
Once it has reached the tumor, NGR-hTNF performs its antitumor action. 
The Phase III (NGR015)  clinical trial is in progress in 35 clinical centers in Europe (Italy, UK, Ireland, Poland and Belgium), USA, Canada and Egypt. NGR-hTNF is the only drug being tested in Phase III trials  for the treatment of relapsed Mesothelioma, and has been granted Orphan Drug designation both in Europe and USA.

References

External links 
 

Cancer treatments
Recombinant proteins